Chris Cocotos is an American former professional tennis player.

Cocotos, an alumnus of The Benjamin School in Palm Beach, was a national representative at junior level and played varsity tennis for Stanford University. His doubles partnership at Stanford with Alex O'Brien topped the collegiate rankings and they won the 1992 NCAA Division I doubles championships. The pair competed together in the men's doubles main draw of the 1992 US Open, where they fell in the first round to John McEnroe and Michael Stich.

References

External links
 
 

Year of birth missing (living people)
Living people
American male tennis players
Stanford Cardinal men's tennis players
Tennis people from Florida